Icelandic magical staves are sigils that were credited with supposed magical effect preserved in various Icelandic grimoires, such as the Galdrabók, dating from the 17th century and later.

Table of magical staves

See also
 Galdr
 Hex sign
 Runic magic

References

External links

List of the staves at the Museum of Icelandic Sorcery and Witchcraft

Icelandic folklore
Icelandic culture
Witchcraft in Iceland
Magic symbols